Patxi Usobiaga Lakunza (born September 7, 1980), best known as Patxi Usobiaga, is a Spanish professional rock climber, sports climber and boulderer. He is known for winning two Lead Climbing World Cups in a row, and for being the first-ever climber in history to onsight an  route.

Biography 
Usobiaga started climbing in Atxarte when he was 10 years old. For four years he was belayed by his father. When he was 15, he climbed his first 8a route, ConanDax Librarian, in Araotz. When he was 18 he redpointed his first 8b route, Parva Naturalia, in Araotz.

From 1997 to 1999 he participated in youth competitions. In 2000, he started competing at the Lead Climbing World Cup. In 2003 he earned his first gold medal in Edinburgh. When he was 26 he earned his first Lead climbing World Cup. Next year, he won his second one. Due to these outstanding achievements he was awarded the Salewa Rock Award in 2007.

In 2009 he won the Lead Climbing World Championships in Qinghai (CHN). At the end of 2009 he underwent a shoulder surgery and after three months of rehabilitative therapy he started training again.

In June 2010 a car accident caused a painful slipped disk. In 2011, he announced his retirement from competitions.

He climbed 267 routes graded between 8a and 9a+, 158 of which were onsighted. He was the first climber who onsighted a 8c+ route (Bizi Euskaraz, in Etxauri, 2007).

Rankings

Climbing World Cup

Climbing World Championships

Climbing European Championships

Number of medals in the Climbing World Cup

Lead

Rock climbing 
Number of ascended routes:
 4  
 14 
 31  (1 of which onsighted)
 42   (7 of which onsighted)
 87  and 8b+ (68 of which onsighted)

Redpointed routes 
:

Pachamama – Oliana (ESP) – November 10, 2017
 La novena enmienda – Santa Linya (ESP) – December 3, 2007
 La Rambla – Siurana (ESP) – November 22, 2007 – Fifth ascent
 Realization – Céüse (FRA) – July 29, 2004 – Third ascent

:
 PuntX – Gorges du Loup (FRA) – September 10, 2010
 Hades – Nassereith (AUT) – August 23, 2009 – Redpointed on second attempt. First ascent by Andreas Bindhammer, 2008
 Action directe – Frankenjura – October 24, 2008 – Eleventh ascent
 Nice to eat you – Pierrot beach (FRA) – July 22, 2008 – Second ascent. First ascent by Mike Fussilier
 Fabela Pa La Enmienda – Santa Linya (ESP) – March 22, 2008
 Mendeku – Egino (ESP) – December 16, 2007 – Second ascent. First ascent by Iker Pou
 Fuck The system – Santa Linya (ESP) – December 9, 2007 – First ascent
 Esclatamasters –  (ESP) – December 7, 2007 – Third ascent. First ascent by Ramón Julián Puigblanqué
 Faxismoaren txontxogiloak – Etxauri (ESP) – December 22, 2007 – First ascent
 Begi Puntuan – Etxauri (ESP) – December 1, 2006 – First ascent
 Kinematix – Gorges du Loup (FRA) – June 14, 2006
 Psikoterapia – Valdegobia (ESP) – July 8, 2004 – First ascent
 Iñi Ameriketan – Baltzola (ESP) – April 1, 2003
 Il Domani – Baltzola (ESP) – March 21, 2003 – First ascent

Onsighted routes 
:
 Bizi Euskaraz – Etxauri (ESP) – December 11, 2007 – First ascent and first-ever 8c+ onsight in history. Project by Ekaitz Maiz.

:
 Absinth – Sparchen (AUT) – July 25, 2010
 Nuska – Baltzola (ESP) – August 1, 2008
 Home sweet home – Pierrot Beach (FRA) – July 20, 2008
 Omerta – Urnersee – July 15, 2008
 Mosca cullonera – Montsant (ESP) – November 30, 2007
 Pata negra – Rodellar (Bierge, (ESP) – October 7, 2006
 Gaua – Lezain (ESP) – October 10, 2005

See also 
List of grade milestones in rock climbing
History of rock climbing
Rankings of most career IFSC gold medals

References

External links 

1980 births
Living people
Spanish rock climbers
World Games gold medalists
World Games silver medalists
Competitors at the 2005 World Games
Competitors at the 2009 World Games
IFSC Climbing World Championships medalists
Sportspeople from Eibar
IFSC Climbing World Cup overall medalists